2nd Chance  is the second studio album by American gospel musician Karen Clark Sheard. It was released on July 30, 2002 on Elektra Records. The release was much anticipated for several reasons; Sheard was only the second gospel artist signed to Elektra Records, and this was her debut for the label. It was also her first release since the success of her Grammy-nominated debut Finally Karen, and a long bout with illness had delayed any releases from her since. The album peaked at #2 on the Billboard Gospel Charts, #3 on the Billboard Contemporary Christian Charts, #27 on the Billboard R&B/Hip-Hop Charts, and #82 on the Billboard 200.

In 2001, Clark-Sheard was faced with a life-threatening crisis when a blood vessel burst during a scheduled hernia surgery.  Her doctors only gave her a 2% chance of survival due to her complications. After the blood clot was surgically removed, Clark-Sheard fell into a coma. The coma lasted three and a half weeks, but Clark-Sheard says she made a miraculous  recovery.  Despite citing hernia surgery, fans continue to speculate Clark-Sheard underwent a gastric bypass operation which led to complications of hernia and brain aneurysm since after the ordeal Sheard returned in 2001 having lost a significant amount of weight. This was later confirmed in the 2020 Clark Sisters biopic.  

Though the release performed well on the charts and Clark-Sheard's vocals were in excellent form, the slick contemporary R&B production was not openly embraced by Sheard's core audience of traditional gospel music listeners. The 2003 follow-up release The Heavens Are Telling returned to the formula of her hugely successful, well-received, and Grammy-nominated debut Finally Karen by offering half of the album as a collection of live tracks, and half as a collection of upbeat studio productions.

Track listing 

Notes
 denotes co-producer

Charts

References

External links 
 

Karen Clark Sheard albums
2002 albums
Albums produced by Missy Elliott
Albums produced by Tim & Bob